Dalmatoreicheia is a genus of beetles in the family Carabidae, containing the following species:

 Dalmatoreicheia janaki Magrini & Bulirsch, 2005
 Dalmatoreicheia maderi Bulirsch & Guéorguiev, 2008

References

Scaritinae